Valle is a municipality in Agder county, Norway. It is located in the traditional district of Setesdal. The administrative centre of the municipality is the village of Valle. Other villages in Valle include Besteland, Brokke, Homme, Hovet, Rygnestad, Rysstad, and Uppstad.

The  municipality is the 82nd largest by area out of the 356 municipalities in Norway. Valle is the 321st most populous municipality in Norway with a population of 1,169.

General information 

Valle was established as a municipality on 1 January 1838 (see formannskapsdistrikt law). On 1 January 1902, the northern part of Valle (population: 476) was separated to become the separate municipality of Bykle. This left Valle with 1,720 inhabitants. On 1 July 1915, the southern district of Valle (population: 658) was separated to form the new municipality of Hylestad. This left Valle with a population of 1,051. During the 1960s, there were many municipal mergers across Norway due to the work of the Schei Committee. On 1 January 1962, the municipalities of Hylestad (population: 662) and Valle (population: 902) were merged into one municipality named Valle.

Name 
The municipality (originally the parish) is named after the old Valle farm, since the first Valle Church was built there. The form of the name is the genitive case, from the common expressions Vallar kirkja (church) and Vallar sókn (parish).

Coat of arms
The coat of arms was granted on 11 May 1984. The official blazon is "Gules five saltires couped Or in saltire. This means the arms have a red field (background) and the charge is a group of five saltire (St. Andrew's cross). The crosses are couped which means they are cut off or separate and they are laid out in saltire which means they are in the form of an X, in the pattern 2-1-2, together forming a larger cross. The crosses have a tincture of Or which means it is colored yellow most of the time, but if it is made out of metal, then gold is used. The design was based on the diagonal beams forming construction and decoration in old Norwegian wooden churches, especially decorating the railings of the second floor balconies. This design was part of the medieval Hylestad Stave Church, located in Rysstad. This pattern is also used in traditional Setesdal sweaters that have long been made and worn in the municipality. The arms were designed by Daniel Rike.

Churches 
The Church of Norway has one parish within the municipality of Valle. It is part of the Otredal prosti (deanery) in the Diocese of Agder og Telemark.

Geography 
The municipality of Valle is bordered to the north by the municipalities of Bykle (in Agder county) and Tokke (in Vestfold og Telemark county). To the east, it is bordered by Fyresdal municipality in Vestfold og Telemark, to the south it is bordered by Bygland municipality in Agder, and to the west it is bordered by Sirdal municipality, also in Agder county.

Valle lies in the middle of Setesdal, a valley and a traditional district in Aust-Agder that included the municipalities of Bykle, Valle, Bygland, Iveland, and Evje og Hornnes. The Otra river flows from the Hardangervidda plateau in Telemark to the north, through the Setesdal valley (and through Valle), into the sea near the city of Kristiansand.

Valle is separated from the neighbouring valleys in the east and west by the large Setesdalsheiene mountain plateaus. Before the valley was linked by road to Kristiansand in the 1840s, people routinely traveled east and west across these moorlands. Other high mountains in Valle include Bergeheii, Skjerkenuten, Svarvarnuten, and Urddalsknuten.

The high mountains are the starting points for several large rivers including the Kvina and Tovdalselva. Several large lakes are also located in Valle including Botnsvatnet, Kolsvatnet, Rosskreppfjorden, Store Bjørnevatn, Straumsfjorden, and Øyarvatnet. The Hallandsfossen and the Gloppefossen are two larger waterfalls in Valle.

There are two central population centres in the municipality: Valle and Rysstad. The village of Valle is the site of the municipal administration and Rysstad was the site of the municipal administration in the old municipality of Hylestad.

Climate
Situated in a long valley at some altitude, Valle has a humid continental climate (Dfb), close to a boreal climate. The driest season is spring, while the wettest is autumn and early winter.

History 

The Hylestad stave church, constructed in the 12th century in Setesdal was demolished in the 19th century. Its portal, with several carved scenes illustrating the legend of Sigurd Fåvnesbane (Sigurd the Dragon-slayer), is on display at University Museum of Antiquities in Oslo (Universitetets Oldsaksamling, Historisk Museum, Oslo). Sigurd's slaying of Fafnir with his sword Gram is described in the Prose Edda of Snorri Sturluson and the Volsunga saga as well as alluded to in Beowulf and Njáls saga.

Rygnestadtunet is a historical family farm in Rygnestad, built by Vonde-Åsmund (Åsmund the Evil) in the mid-1500s. Today, it is an open-air museum that is part of the Setesdal Museum. The farm was sold to museum by Gyro Rygnestad and her family in the 1920s. Today, it is represented to visitors exactly as it was in 1919. Grave findings around the farm indicate that the site was settled as early as 900 AD. Another farm museum in Valle is Tveitetunet. There are also several old silver smithies and barns that can be seen in Rysstad.

Historically, Valle was very isolated from other parts of Setesdal. To get from Valle to the Bykle area to the north, residents had to traverse the Byklestigen pass along the river Otra. The pass was a torturous trail up a steep cliff face. Until the 1870s, it was the only route to travel from Valle in the middle Setesdal valley to Bykle in the north. It runs above the river Otra and was the site of numerous accidents on the hazardous route. Today, the Norwegian National Road 9 passes through the mountain in a tunnel providing a fast, easy route north.

Between Valle in Setesdal on the western side of the mountains and Fyresdal on the eastern side, one finds a medieval trail over the high plateau that priests and bishops used in order to get between the counties of Agder and Telemark. This track is named Bispevegen ("Bishop's Road") and every year a march called "Bispevegmarsjen" ("The Bishop's Road March") starts at Kleivgrend in Fyresdal.

Traditional music is popular in this region. There is a Jew's harp monument in Valle. (Photo)

Government 
All municipalities in Norway, including Valle, are responsible for primary education (through 10th grade), outpatient health services, senior citizen services, unemployment and other social services, zoning, economic development, and municipal roads. The municipality is governed by a municipal council of elected representatives, which in turn elect a mayor.  The municipality falls under the Agder District Court and the Agder Court of Appeal.

Municipal council 
The municipal council of Valle is made up of 15 representatives that are elected to four-year terms. Currently, the party breakdown is as follows:

Notable residents 

 Ole Knudsen Tvedten (1757/8 in Valle – 1837) a Norwegian farmer, district sheriff and rep. at the Norwegian Constituent Assembly in 1814
 Bjug Harstad (1848 in Setesdal – 1933) his family emigrated to USA in 1861, he became a Lutheran pastor, founding president of Pacific Lutheran University
 Aani Aanisson Rysstad (1894 in Valle – 1965) a politician, Mayor of Valle 1934–1937
 Sigurd Helle (1920 in Hylestad – 2013) a Norwegian topographer and explorer
 Paal-Helge Haugen (born 1945 in Valle) a poet, novelist, dramatist and children's writer
 Kirsten Bråten Berg (born 1950) a Norwegian traditional folk singer, silversmith and government scholar, she lives Valle

References

External links 

 Municipal fact sheet from Statistics Norway 
 
 Valle municipality 
 Otra Kraft 
 Culture in Valle on the map 
 Map hiking 

 
Setesdal
Municipalities of Agder
1838 establishments in Norway